Chip Jacobs is an American author and journalist who has written multiple books of non-fiction, including the social histories Smogtown: The Lung-Burning History of Pollution in Los Angeles (2008) and its follow-up, The People’s Republic of Chemicals (2014). His debut novel, Arroyo (2019), was a Los Angeles Times bestseller.

Writing

Non-fiction 
With fellow investigative journalist William J. Kelly, Jacobs wrote the social history Smogtown: The Lung-Burning History of Pollution in Los Angeles (2008), which Booklist praised as “remarkably entertaining and informative,” As a follow-up, Jacobs and Kelly wrote The People’s Republic of Chemicals (2014), which Kirkus called "hard-hitting" and "[a] scathing denunciation of how America outsourced its industrial capacity to China, a package that included catastrophic pollution."

His dark comedy, true crime book, The Ascension of Jerry (2012), was about a murder trial in 1979 Los Angeles. He also wrote the biography Strange As It Seems: The Impossible Life of Gordon Zahler (2016), which Publishers Weekly called “exceptional” storytelling and a “peculiar page turner."

Fiction 
Jacobs's debut novel, Arroyo (2019), is a work of historical fiction set around construction of Pasadena’s mysterious Colorado Street Bridge in 1913. It was a Los Angeles Times and Southern California Independent Booksellers Association bestseller.

Booklist magazine called Arroyo a "a riveting and enjoyable look at how local myths are constructed, and a vivid depiction of a time and a place that felt full of possibilities.” Library Journal said that Jacobs "handles the historical material superbly, skillfully relating the complicated and tragic story of the" Colorado Street Bridge's "construction while convincingly depicting a variety of famous historical figures.”

Life 
Jacobs is from Pasadena, California.

Select works 
 Smogtown: The Lung-burning History of Pollution in Los Angeles (2008), with William J. Kelly 
 Wheeling the Deal: the Outrageous Legend of Gordon Zahler, Hollywood's Flashiest Quadriplegic (2008) 
 The Ascension of Jerry: Murder, Hitmen, and the Making of L.A. Muckraker Jerry Schneiderman (2012) 
 The People's Republic of Chemicals (2014), with William J. Kelly 
 Strange as it Seems (2016) 
 Arroyo: A Novel (2019)

References 

Year of birth missing (living people)
Living people
21st-century American journalists
21st-century American novelists
Writers from Pasadena, California